Gastaldello is a surname. Notable people with the surname include:

Béryl Gastaldello (born 1995), French swimmer
Daniele Gastaldello (born 1983), Italian footballer